Strictly Come Dancing returned for its nineteenth series with a launch show on 18 September 2021 on BBC One, with the live shows beginning on 25 September. Tess Daly and Claudia Winkleman returned as hosts, while Rylan Clark-Neal returned to host Strictly: It Takes Two, alongside new presenter Janette Manrara, who replaced Zoe Ball following her departure from the show. In June 2021, the BBC announced that Craig Revel Horwood, Shirley Ballas and Motsi Mabuse would return to the judging panel. It was also announced that original professional Anton Du Beke, who served as a guest judge in the previous series, would join the panel in place of Bruno Tonioli, who did not return for the second year in a row due to travel restrictions imposed by the COVID-19 pandemic.

In July 2021, the show's executive producer, Sarah James, said the show would return for a "full-length series", with fifteen celebrities, themed weeks, pre-recorded professional group dances and a Christmas special, but not a Blackpool Tower Ballroom special. From this series, the contestants were no longer restricted to perform one of the "couple's choice" categories contemporary, theatre/jazz or street/commercial and could instead incorporate the routine however they wished. In September, a row broke out over whether dancers should be vaccinated against COVID-19. Reports had suggested that three dancers had refused to be vaccinated, with one unnamed celebrity already having to self-isolate since the show's launch night had been filmed.

The series was won by Rose Ayling-Ellis and her professional partner Giovanni Pernice. Ayling-Ellis was also the first deaf contestant to appear on the programme. The series also featured the first all-male partnership of John Whaite and Johannes Radebe, who finished as runner-up. AJ Odudu also qualified for the final with partner Kai Widdrington, but was forced to withdraw the day prior after injuring her ankle.

Professional dancers
In March 2021, the BBC announced that all sixteen professional dancers from the eighteenth series would return in 2021. However, in June, the BBC revealed that Janette Manrara and Anton Du Beke would not be reprising their dancing roles: Manrara was announced as a new co-host of It Takes Two, succeeding Zoe Ball, while Du Beke was revealed to be replacing Bruno Tonioli on the judging panel.

In July 2021, the BBC announced that four new professional dancers would be joining the fourteen remaining returning pros. These are: six-time Italian Latin and Ballroom Champion Nikita Kuzmin, who was also a professional dancer on the German version of the show in 2020; reigning South African Latin Champion Cameron Lombard, who was also a finalist on South Africa's Got Talent in 2012; Polish Open Latin Champion Jowita Przystał, who won The Greatest Dancer in 2020; and World Junior Latin American Champion Kai Widdrington, who was also a Britain's Got Talent finalist in 2012 and former professional and two-time finalist on the Irish version of Dancing with the Stars.

Graziano Di Prima received a celebrity partner for the first time since the sixteenth series whilst Nadiya Bychkova and Neil Jones received a celebrity partner for the first time since the seventeenth series. Nancy Xu received a celebrity partner for the first time, as did new professionals Nikita Kuzmin and Kai Widdrington, while Luba Mushtuk and other new professionals Cameron Lombard and Jowita Przystał did not receive a partner.

Couples
On 4 August 2021, the first three celebrities participating in the series were revealed to be Tom Fletcher, Robert Webb and AJ Odudu. The following day, it was announced that John Whaite would feature in the first all-male same-sex couple, after Nicola Adams and Katya Jones became the first all-female couple the previous series. Celebrity contestants continued to be revealed until 13 August 2021, when the full line-up was announced. On 13 October it was announced that Robert Webb had been advised to withdraw from the competition due to health problems. On 17 December, the day before the final, it was announced that AJ Odudu had withdrawn from the competition after suffering ligament damage in her right ankle, making this the first series to have two withdrawals. It was also the first series since series 7 to only feature two finalists.

Scoring chart

Average chart

Highest and lowest scoring performances of the series
The highest and lowest performances in each dance according to the judges' scale are as follows. 

 Robert Webb is the only celebrity not to land on this list.

Couples' highest and lowest scoring dances
The highest and lowest performances for each couple are listed.

Weekly scores and songs
Unless indicated otherwise, individual judges scores in the charts below (given in parentheses) are listed in this order from left to right: Craig Revel Horwood, Motsi Mabuse, Shirley Ballas, Anton Du Beke.

Launch show
Musical guest: Anne-Marie—"Kiss My (Uh-Oh)"

Week 1
Running order

Week 2
Musical guests: Tom Grennan—"Something Better"; Griff—"One Night"
Running order

Due to testing positive for COVID-19, Tom & Amy were unable to perform. Under the rules of the show, they were given a bye to the following week.
Judges' votes to save
Horwood: Katie & Gorka
Mabuse: Katie & Gorka
Du Beke: Nina & Neil 
Ballas: Katie & Gorka

Week 3: Movie Week
Musical guest: Ben Platt—"You Will Be Found"
Running order

Judges' votes to save
Horwood: Judi & Graziano
Mabuse: Judi & Graziano
Du Beke: Katie & Gorka
Ballas: Judi & Graziano

Week 4
Musical guest: Westlife—"Starlight"
Running order

Due to a back injury sustained by Ugo, Ugo & Oti were unable to perform. Under the rules of the show, they were given a bye to the following week. Robert & Dianne withdrew from the competition earlier in the week, due to ill health.
Judges' votes to save
Horwood: Judi & Graziano
Mabuse: Judi & Graziano 
Du Beke: Judi & Graziano 
Ballas: Did not vote, but would have voted to save Greg & Karen

Week 5
Musical guests: Craig David & MNEK—"Who You Are"
Running order

Due to Judi testing positive for COVID-19, Judi & Graziano were unable to perform. Under the rules of the show, they were given a bye to the following week.
Judges' votes to save
Horwood: Rhys & Nancy
Mabuse: Rhys & Nancy
Du Beke: Rhys & Nancy
Ballas: Did not vote, but would have voted to save Rhys & Nancy

Week 6: Halloween Week
Musical guest: Gregory Porter—"Dry Bones"
Running order

Judges' votes to save
Horwood: Adam & Katya
Mabuse: Adam & Katya
Du Beke: Adam & Katya
Ballas: Did not vote, but would have voted to save Adam & Katya

Week 7
Musical guest: The Script—"Superheroes"
Running order

Judges' votes to save
Horwood: Tilly & Nikita
Mabuse: Tilly & Nikita
Du Beke: Tilly & Nikita
Ballas: Did not vote, but would have voted to save Adam & Katya

Week 8
Musical guest: James Blunt—"Goodbye My Lover"
Running order

Judges' votes to save
Horwood: Tilly & Nikita
Mabuse: Tilly & Nikita
Du Beke: Tilly & Nikita
Ballas: Did not vote, but would have voted to save Tilly & Nikita

Week 9: Musicals Week
Individual judges scores in the chart below (given in parentheses) are listed in this order from left to right: Cynthia Erivo, Motsi Mabuse, Shirley Ballas, Anton Du Beke.
Musical guests: Max Harwood & The Feeling—"Out of the Darkness (A Place Where We Belong)"
Running order

On 15 November it was announced Craig Revel Horwood had tested positive for COVID-19, was self-isolating following the latest government guidelines and would therefore miss week 9 of the competition. On 19 November, it was announced Cynthia Erivo would replace him on the judging panel for that week.

Judges' votes to save
Erivo: Rhys & Nancy
Mabuse: Rhys & Nancy 
Du Beke: Rhys & Nancy
Ballas: Did not vote, but would have voted to save Tom & Amy

Week 10
Individual judges scores in the chart below (given in parentheses) are listed in this order from left to right: Craig Revel Horwood, Cynthia Erivo, Shirley Ballas, Anton Du Beke.
Musical guest: Years & Years—"Sweet Talker"
Running order

On 26 November it was announced Motsi Mabuse had come into contact with someone who had tested positive for COVID-19. Whilst Mabuse was double vaccinated (which would mean exemption from the self-isolation guidelines), the UK government did not recognise her vaccines so would not be able to travel back from Germany. It was announced that Cynthia Erivo would return to the judging panel, replacing Mabuse for that week.

Judges' votes to save
Horwood: Rhys & Nancy
Erivo: Rhys & Nancy 
Du Beke: Rhys & Nancy
Ballas: Did not vote, but would have voted to save Rhys & Nancy

Week 11: Quarter-Final
Musical guest: JLS—"Postcard"
Running order

Judges' votes to save
Horwood: AJ & Kai
Mabuse: AJ & Kai
Du Beke: AJ & Kai
Ballas: Did not vote, but would have voted to save AJ & Kai

Week 12: Semi-Final

For the Dance Off, Rhys & Nancy chose to dance their Samba, while John & Johannes chose to dance their Jive.
Judges' votes to save
Horwood: John & Johannes
Mabuse: John & Johannes
Du Beke: John & Johannes
Ballas: Did not vote, but would have voted to save John & Johannes

Week 13: Final
Musical guest: Ed Sheeran—"Bad Habits"
Running order

AJ & Kai withdrew from the final, after AJ suffered ligament damage in her right ankle.

Dance chart

 Highest scoring dance
 Lowest scoring dance
 Not performed due to illness or injury
 Couple withdrew that week

Week 1: American Smooth, Cha-Cha-Cha, Jive, Quickstep, Samba, Tango, Viennese Waltz or Waltz
Week 2: One unlearned dance (introducing Charleston, Couple's Choice, Foxtrot, Paso Doble & Salsa)
Week 3: (Movie Week) One unlearned dance (introducing Rumba)
Week 4: One unlearned dance (introducing Argentine Tango)
Week 5: One unlearned dance
Week 6: (Halloween Week) One unlearned dance
Weeks 7 & 8: One unlearned dance
Week 9: (Musicals Week) One unlearned dance
Weeks 10 & 11: One unlearned dance
Week 12 (Semi-Final): Two unlearned dances
Week 13 (Final): Judges' choice, Favourite dance & Showdance

Reception
Series 19 received positive reviews from fans and critics.
Lottie Townend of Glasgow University Guardian said it "the series provided a place of escape and comfort from the difficulties of the outside world. You become personally invested in each contestant’s journey, root for their success and feel the warmth through their shared love for dance". Jane Rackham of Radio Times was positive towards this season's unpredictability writing "This must be the most unpredictable series of Strictly ever. And not only because several participants had to miss a show after testing positive for Covid".

Ratings
Weekly ratings for each show on BBC One. All ratings are provided by BARB.

References

External links
 

2021 British television seasons
Series19